William D. "Darby" O'Brien (September 1, 1863 – June 15, 1893) was a Major League Baseball player in the late 19th century. He played outfield for the New York Metropolitans in 1887 and the Brooklyn Bridegrooms/Grooms from 1888–1892. O'Brien developed lung problems during his playing career and continued to play, despite his ill health. When he reported to spring training for the 1893 season, the team found that he was too ill to play and sent him to Colorado to try to recover. They played a benefit game to raise money for him.

In 709 games over six seasons, O'Brien posted a .282 batting average (805-for-2856) with 577 runs, 20 home runs, 394 runs batted in, 321 stolen bases and 231 bases on balls. He finished his career with a .933 fielding percentage.

O'Brien died later that year of typhoid fever at the age of 29.

See also
List of Major League Baseball career stolen bases leaders
List of Major League Baseball single-game hits leaders

References

External links

Baseball Almanac

1863 births
1893 deaths
New York Metropolitans players
Brooklyn Bridegrooms players
Brooklyn Grooms players
Major League Baseball outfielders
Winona Clippers players
Omaha Omahogs players
Keokuk Hawkeyes players
Denver Mountain Lions players
19th-century baseball players
Baseball players from Illinois
Sportspeople from Peoria, Illinois
Deaths from typhoid fever